Kahnuj-e Damaneh (also Romanized as Kahnūj-e Dāmaneh; also known as Kahnūj) is a village in Deh Bakri Rural District, in the Central District of Bam County, Kerman Province, Iran. At the 2006 census, its population was 17, in 4 families.

References 

Populated places in Bam County